Jack Hunter (born 28 April 1995) is a New Zealand Under-19s and first-class cricketer. He played Under-19 Cricket World Cup in 2014. He was born in Dunedin, Otago and made his senior cricket debut for Otago in 2015 having played age-group cricket for the team. He went on to make his List A debut in January 2017 in the 2016–17 Ford Trophy and his Twenty20 debut in the 2017–18 Super Smash in December 2017.
Jack has been a member of “The Wolfpack” since December 2016.

References

External links
 

Living people
1995 births
Cricketers from Dunedin
New Zealand cricketers
Otago cricketers